Britannia University (BU) is a private university established in 2010 under the 2010 Private University Act. The university is located at Paduar Bazar, Bishwa Road, Comilla, Bangladesh.

History
In April 2022, the University Grants Commission (UGC) directed the university to stop enrolling students. The UGC stated that the university has been operating without a vice chancellor appointed by the chancellor since 2017, and has never had a pro-vice chancellor or treasurer. The teaching staff is inadequate in number and qualifications, and no research is being conducted. Furthermore, the university has failed to move to a permanent campus by the statutory deadline, and "the library is useless".

Campus
Until permanent facilities are constructed, Britannia University's temporary campus is at Paduar Bazar in Comilla town.

Faculty

Faculty of Engineering 
 BSc. in Computer science and engineering (CSE)
 BSc. in CSE (For Diploma Engineers) Evening
 M.Sc. in Computer Science and Engineering

School of Business 
 Bachelor of Business Administration (BBA)
 Master of Business Administration MBA (2 Years)
 Master of Business Administration MBA (1 Year)
 Executive Master of Business Administration (EMBA)

Department of English 
 BA Hon's. in English
 MA in English (1 Year)
 MA in English(2 Years)

School of Law 
 LLB Hon's.
 LLM(1 Year)
 LL.M (2 Year)

Department of Economics 
 BSS Hon's. in Economics
 MSS in Applied Sociology (Evening)
 MSS in Economics

See also
 List of Educational Institutions in Comilla

References

External links
 

Private universities in Bangladesh
Education in Cumilla